A modular smartphone is a smartphone made using components that can be independently upgraded or replaced as modules. This aims to reduce electronic waste, lower repair costs and increase user comfort.

The most important component is the main board, to which others (such as cameras or batteries) are attached. These are packaged in easy-to-remove modules which can be replaced as needed without having to rework the soldering. Components could be obtained from open-source hardware stores.

History
Desktop computers housed in tower cases can easily swap parts such as hard drives, memory, and graphics cards. Among early mobile devices, the Handspring Visor PDA had a Springboard Expansion Slot which could give it the capabilities such as a phone, GPS, a modem, or a camera - but only one at a time.  The Israeli startup Modu in 2008 created a phone and screen core that could be added to various cases that gave the device features such as a keyboard or camera; the company failed and sold its patents to Google in 2011.

In 2013, Phonebloks was the first modular smartphone concept to attract widespread attention. Later in 2013, Motorola Mobility, then a subsidiary of Google, unveiled Project Ara, a concept for a modular smartphone inspired by the Phonebloks concept. The designer of Phonebloks was  collaborating with Motorola. The project was retained by Google when it sold Motorola to Lenovo, and underwent further development.

During 2015, the Dutch social enterprise Fairphone developed the Fairphone 2, the first publicly available modular smartphone which was released to sale in December that year. In 2016, two manufacturers unveiled phone lines with modular accessory systems. LG Electronics unveiled its LG G5 smartphone, which allows add-on modules to be installed by removing its "chin" and battery, and attaching the battery to an accessory that is then re-inserted into the phone. LG unveiled camera grip and audio enhancement accessories as part of the launch of the device. Motorola later unveiled the Moto Z, which allows the installation of case-like accessories known as "MotoMods", mounted using magnets to the rear of the device and a pogo pin connector for communication.

The Shiftphone 6m was developed by the German social enterprise SHIFT during 2015 and 2016. It is their latest high-end flagship model and the second easy repairable phone on the market since the Fairphone 2.

At the Google I/O conference in May 2015, Google unveiled a "Developer Edition" of Project Ara meant for release later in the year, now consisting of a base phone with non-modular components, and extensible with modules for adding supplemental features. Google intended to launch Project Ara for consumers in 2017. Project Ara was ultimately shelved on September 2, 2016.

On January 17, 2017, Facebook filed a patent for a modular smartphone design, which was published on July 20 that year.

Derivatives 
Similar to modular smartphones, other devices such as modular smartwatches and functional (smart) cases have been envisioned.  The modular smartwatch goes under the name Blocks and uses smart modules as links in the wristband. Two companies making smartphone cases Nexpaq and Moscase have designs similar to Project Ara (previously Phonebloks) and the Moto Z, respectively. As of September 18, 2017, Nexpaq rebranded to Moduware, and no longer produces phone cases. Their new derivative of the phoneblocks concept is a battery with the same modular components as their Nexpaq case.

Environmental impact

Modular phones are a sustainable consumer electronic. The supply chain for cell phones includes conflict minerals that are sold by armed groups after being mined in the circumstances of human rights abuses and armed conflicts. Many smart phones are produced in factories that have been accused of labor abuses. Modular phones have been proposed as an alternative to annual phone releases to minimize electronic waste. (Electronic waste is one of the world's fastest growing sources of waste). 

In addition to the human rights abuses, the environmental impact of mining conflict minerals can result in soil degradation and heavy metal pollution. Huge amounts of energy, ore and processing power are required to obtain small quantities of the minerals used in the circuit board, display and battery of mobile phones.

Planned obsolescence is a design strategy that dates to 1954 when American industrial designer Brooks Stevens suggested that products become obsolete by design before they failed to improve sales. Incremental annual design updates would be "a little newer, a little better, and a little sooner than necessary".

Challenges
Critics point out that a modular phone would need to have connections durable enough that it would not fall apart when dropped, put in a pocket or sat upon. Project Ara used latches and electropermanent magnets to achieve this. 

Existing phones are highly optimized for physical space, making pluggable modules that are highly space-optimal difficult, and configuration and regulatory approval of the radio hardware becomes more complicated.

Another concern is that consumers would be overwhelmed by too many choices, or prefer pre-packaged phones. It is unclear how viable the secondary component market would be, until products become available. 

Some critics worry about loss of control by the manufacturer over the full hardware platform, brand erosion, consumers who make poor choices, whether separately purchased components would cost more than a pre-packaged phone would, and whether modular phones would be more prone to breakage (and thus create more e-waste). Proponents hope that the technical challenges can be overcome and that a viable market ecosystem (the hardware version of an app store) will enable finer-grained competition that will benefit consumers with better and cheaper choices.

Modular phone platforms

Current
 Fairphone 4, Fairphone 3, 2 and 1 by Fairphone
 Librem 5, by Purism
 Moto Z, Moto Z Force and Moto Z Play by Motorola Mobility
 Shift6mq, Shift6m and Shift5me by SHIFT
 Pinephone, by Pine64

In development
 SHIFTmu by SHIFT

Discontinued
 LG G5 by LG
 Essential Phone by Essential Products
 Project Ara by Google
 Phonebloks

See also

References

External links

 Google plans 2015 Project Ara launch in Puerto Rico, partnering with Ingram Micro, OpenMobile, and Claro.
 How Google’s Project Ara smartphone will be
 Project Ara official website
 Motorola Mobility
 Project Ara Blog
 Toshiba Project Ara Modules: camera, media bar, Wi-Fi, display module, wireless communication and solution for activity measuring module.
 Phonebloks official website
 Phonebloks first video, the idea
 Phonebloks second video, the next step
Nexpaq rebrand

 
Environmental impact of products
Sustainable technologies